Litotetothrips is a genus of thrips in the family Phlaeothripidae.

Species
 Litotetothrips berangan
 Litotetothrips guineaensis
 Litotetothrips hainanensis
 Litotetothrips keladan
 Litotetothrips kochummeni
 Litotetothrips medangteja
 Litotetothrips pasaniae
 Litotetothrips pinanganus
 Litotetothrips roberti
 Litotetothrips rotundus
 Litotetothrips shoreae

References

Phlaeothripidae
Thrips
Thrips genera
Insects described in 1929
Taxa named by Hermann Priesner